Leupaxin is a protein that in humans is encoded by the LPXN gene.

The product encoded by this gene is preferentially expressed in hematopoietic cells and is most homologous to the focal adhesion protein, paxillin. It may function in cell type-specific signaling by associating with PYK2, a member of focal adhesion kinase family. As a substrate for a tyrosine kinase in lymphoid cells, this protein may also function in, and be regulated by tyrosine kinase activity.

References

Further reading